A list of American films released in 1943.

Casablanca won for Best Picture at the Academy Awards.

A–B

C–D

E–F

G–H

I–J

K–L

M–N

O–R

S

T

U–Z

Documentaries

Serials

Shorts

See also
 1943 in the United States

References

External links

1943 films at the Internet Movie Database

1943
Films
Lists of 1943 films by country or language